Frank Harmon Myers (1899 – 1956) was an Impressionist painter. His work includes a variety of topics but is best known for his seascapes.

Personal life
Frank H. Myers was born in Cleves, Ohio. His family moved to Cincinnati in 1907. Myers studied at the Art Academy of Cincinnati through 1920. In June 1921, he went to France with John Ellsworth Weis (1892-1962), who had been one of his teachers at the Academy. When they returned to Cincinnati, Myers began teaching at the Art Academy where he received commissions for portraits.

In 1925 he married Ella Price, a young school teacher.  They spent their honeymoon in Europe, staying in Paris and Spain.  The following year they made an extended trip West to Colorado and California.  Upon their return they stopped in Santa Fe, New Mexico where he met, and painted with, Joseph Henry Sharp.

Myers took a sabbatical in 1932 and painted in Santa Fe, New Mexico with Joseph Henry Sharp. In the early forties, Myers moved with his wife and son to the Monterey peninsula. They lived in Pacific Grove. Myers was active in the Carmel Art Association and served as president in 1953.

Myers died of a heart attack in San Francisco, California on March 7, 1956.

History

Known for his works produced with brightly colored expressive brush strokes showing his interest in French impressionism, he eventually focused on painting the coastal areas of California.
 
In the 1930s his health began to falter, and he suffered bouts of depression.  In 1940 he took a leave of absence, and visited Monterey, California.  He was captivated by the California coastal region, and stayed there for the rest of his life.  From that point on he produced, almost exclusively, seascapes of the Monterey Peninsula area.
 
A well-respected leader of the Carmel -Monterey art community, he served as the President of the Carmel Art Association in 1953.  His painting companions included Armin Hansen, and Donald Teague.  Together they defined the Monterey Peninsula art scene for years to come.

Legacy
His works have been widely exhibited and are in the permanent collections of many prestigious museums, including the National Museum of American Art, University of Cincinnati, Museum of New Mexico, San Diego Museum of Art, Canton Museum of Art, Monterey Peninsula Museum of Art, The Irvine Museum, the Oakland Museum of Art, the Smithsonian Institution,Cincinnati Museum of Art, and many others.

Listings 
Myers is listed in:
Artists In California: 1786-1940 (Edan Milton Hughes); 
Who Was Who In American Art (Falk); 
Artists of the American West (Dawdy); 
Art Across America (Gerdts); 
Encyclopedia of Artists of the American West (Samuels); 
Yesterday's Artists On The Monterey Peninsula (Spangenberg); 
Art & Artists of the Monterey Peninsula (Harbick); 
Carmel Art Association: A History (Hoag McGlynn); Mallett; 
Society of Independent Artists; 
Fieldings; the Artist's Bluebook (Dunbier); 
AskART.com; the newly published Carmel Art Association: Its Legends and Legacies, 1927-2007 (Crispo & Watson); and many others.
Smithsonian American Art Museum (SAAM) has five Myers paintings in its collection. Some of the other institutions with paintings by Myers include the Cincinnati Art Museum and The Irvine Museum.

See also
California Tonalism        									
California Plein-Air Painting

References 

 The biographical information in this article comes from the catalog for a 1988 exhibit at Art Academy of Cincinnati titled Frank H Myers: A Retrospective.

External links
Artwork by Frank Harmon Myers

American Impressionist painters
Painters from California
20th-century American painters
American male painters
Artists from Cincinnati
People from Cleves, Ohio
1899 births
1956 deaths
People from Pacific Grove, California
20th-century American male artists